Without Sinking is the second album from Icelandic artist Hildur Guðnadóttir, released in 2009. Participating on the album are fellow Icelandic musicians Skúli Sverrisson and Jóhann Jóhannsson as well as her father Guðni Franzson, while the mixing was done by Valgeir Sigurðsson and Hildur herself.

Track listing

Personnel
Hildur Guðnadóttir – cello,  vocals, zither, composition, mixing
Guðni Franzson – clarinet, bass clarinet
Jóhann Jóhannsson – organ
Skúli Sverrisson – bass, engineering
Denis Blackham – mastering
Valgeir Sigurðsson – mixing
Jon Wozencroft – photography

References

2009 albums
Hildur Guðnadóttir albums
Touch Music albums